Daniel Cojocaru (born 27 May 1969) is a retired Romanian athlete who specialised in the sprinting events. He represented his country at the 1992 Summer Olympics, as well as three consecutive World Championships starting in 1991. His best individual result was the fifth place at the 1994 European Championships.

His 100 metres personal best of 10.21 is the current national record.

Competition record

Personal bests
Outdoor
100 metres – 10.21 (+0.2 m/s) (Bucharest 1994) NR
200 metres – 20.75 (-0.4 m/s) (Bucharest 1994)
400 metres – 46.91 (Alexandroupoli 1988)
Indoor
60 metres – 6.63 (Bucharest 1998)
100 metres – 10.53 (Jablonec nad Nisou 1995)
200 metres – 21.09 (Piraeus 1995)

References

1969 births
Living people
Romanian male sprinters
Athletes (track and field) at the 1992 Summer Olympics
Olympic athletes of Romania
Competitors at the 1995 Summer Universiade